The CFL class 4000 is a variant of the Bombardier TRAXX locos found working across Europe. Within Luxembourg they work on the local passenger services (crossing the borders into France or Belgium as necessary. They also work freight traffic. Their 15 kV capability allows them to work across the border to Germany. Even though they are capable of running in France, they are not allowed to do so for security reasons.

Their slab sided body work has been used for advertising.

External links
Rail.lu page
D'Serie 4000 op dem Site vum CFL
Spoorgroep Luxemburg

4000
25 kV AC locomotives
15 kV AC locomotives
Bo′Bo′ locomotives
Electric locomotives of Luxembourg
Railway locomotives introduced in 2004
TRAXX
Standard gauge locomotives of Luxembourg